is a train station in Chikusa-ku, Nagoya, Aichi Prefecture, Japan

Lines

 (Station number: S09)

Layout

Platforms

See also
 Nagoya Institute of Technology

References

External links
 
 Nagoya Trade and Industry Center 

Chikusa-ku, Nagoya
Railway stations in Japan opened in 1994
Railway stations in Aichi Prefecture